Jeremy Wilcox (born February 22, 1979 in Calgary, Alberta) is a male volleyball player from Canada, who competed for the Men's National Team as a setter. He was a member of the national squad who ended up in seventh place at the 2007 Pan American Games in Rio de Janeiro, Brazil.

References
Canada Olympic Committee

1979 births
Living people
Canadian men's volleyball players
Pan American Games competitors for Canada
Sportspeople from Calgary
University of Calgary alumni
Volleyball players at the 2007 Pan American Games